Federico Agustín Moreira Guarino (born 23 July 1993) is a Uruguayan cyclist, who most recently rode for Uruguayan amateur team CC Cerro Largo. His brother Mauricio Moreira is also a cyclist.

Major results

2012
 1st  Time trial, National Under-23 Road Championships
 3rd Time trial, National Road Championships
2014
 1st  Time trial, National Under-23 Road Championships
 3rd Time trial, National Road Championships
2015
 1st  Time trial, National Under-23 Road Championships
 9th Overall Vuelta del Uruguay
1st  Young rider classification
2016
 1st  Time trial, National Road Championships
2017
 1st  Time trial, National Road Championships
 9th Time trial, Pan American Road Championships
2018
 2nd Time trial, National Road Championships
 3rd Overall Vuelta del Uruguay
 9th Time trial, Pan American Road Championships
2019
 2nd Overall Rutas de América
1st Stage 6b
 7th Overall Vuelta del Uruguay

References

External links

1993 births
Living people
Uruguayan male cyclists